Rail transport in India is an important mode of conveyance for people and goods in India. Indian Railways (IR) is the primary operator of rail operations throughout the country. IR is a state-owned organisation of the Ministry of Railways, which historically had its own government budget. Between 2019 and 2020, 22.15 million passengers used the Indian Railways network daily. In the same period, 3.32 million metric tons of freight was also shipped daily on the IR network.

Other locally owned public corporations operate various suburban and urban railways throughout the country, such as Chennai Metro and the trams in Kolkata. Private sector operations currently exist only for freight trains and railroads, exclusively for non-passenger usage, but there were renewed efforts in 2020 to encourage private sector involvement in the running of passenger trains.

India's national rail network is the fourth-largest in the world (after those of the United States, Russia, and China). 36.83% of routes are double or multi-tracked. As of April 2022,  or 80% of the broad-gauge routes have been electrified with 25 KV AC electric traction. It is one of the busiest networks in the world, transporting 8.086 billion passengers and 1.208 billion tonnes of freight annually. IR is the world's eighth largest employer, with more than 1.254 million employees as of March 2020. As of March 2020, IR's rolling stock consisted of 293,077 freight wagons, 76,608 passenger coaches and 12,729 locomotives.

Successive administrations of the Government of India have worked on improving the railways. Projects include the electrification of the entire IR network by 2023, new trains that can operate on existing rail infrastructure at 200 km/h, and new high-speed railways that can operate at speeds in excess of 300 km/h.

India has also played a supporting role in the improvement of rail infrastructure overseas. , India has invested over $1 billion towards upgrading railways and trains in Sri Lanka using 'Make in India' technology. As of 2020, only three rail connections to foreign countries were functioning, two to Nepal and three to Bangladesh, though an 18 km railway link to Bhutan is also under construction and there have been efforts to reinstate the historic Boat Mail train to Sri Lanka.

History

1832–1852: Industrial railways 

The first proposals for railways in India were made in Madras in 1832. The first train in India ran from Red Hills to Chintadripet bridge in 1836–1837. It was called the Red Hill Railway and used a rotary steam locomotive manufactured by William Avery. The railway was built by Sir Arthur Cotton and was mainly used for transporting granite stones for road-building work in Madras. In 1845, Cotton built the Godavari Dam Construction Railway at Dowleswaram in Rajahmundry, used to supply stone for construction of a dam on the Godavari River.

On 8 May 1845, the Madras Railway was incorporated, and the East Indian Railway Company (EIR) was incorporated the same year. On 1 August 1849, the Great Indian Peninsula Railway (GIPR) was incorporated by an Act of Parliament. A "guarantee system" providing free land and guaranteeing five-percent rates of return to private English companies building railways was finalised on 17 August 1849. In 1851, the Solani Aqueduct Railway was built in Roorkee; freight was hauled by a steam locomotive called Thomason, after a British officer. It was used for transporting construction materials for an aqueduct over the Solani river. In 1852, the Madras Guaranteed Railway Company was incorporated.

1853–1924: Passenger railways and expansion 

The first passenger train in India ran between Bombay (Bori Bunder) and Thane on 16 April 1853. The 14-carriage train was hauled by three steam locomotivesSahib, Sindh and Sultan; it carried 400 people and ran on a line of  built and operated by the Great Indian Peninsula Railway. This line was built in  broad gauge, which became the standard for railways in the country. In May 1854, the Bombay–Thane line was extended to Kalyan by India's first railway bridges, the Thane viaducts, over Thane Creek. In Eastern India, the first passenger railway train ran from Howrah (near Calcutta) to Hoogly on 15 August 1854. The  line was built and operated by EIR. In August 1855, the EIR Express and Fairy Queen steam locomotives started hauling trains. The first passenger train in South India ran from Royapuram and Veyasarapady to Wallajah Road on 1 July 1856 on a  line built and operated by Madras Railway.

On 24 February 1873, the first tramway, a  horse-drawn tramway, opened in Calcutta between Sealdah and Armenian Ghat Street. On 9 May 1874 a horse-drawn tramway began operation in Bombay between Colaba and Parel. In 1880 Calcutta Tramways Company was incorporated.

GIPR started its first workshops in Byculla in 1854 and Madras Railway set up their first workshop at Perambur in 1856. The railway boom continued with the incorporation of the Bombay, Baroda, and Central India Railway (BB&CI)  in 1855, Eastern Bengal Railway in 1858, and the East Coast State Railway in 1890. The Great Southern of India Railway (GSIR) and the Carnatic Railway merged in 1874 to form the South Indian Railway.

In 1897, lighting in passenger coaches was introduced by many railway companies. In 1902, the Jodhpur Railway became the first to introduce electric lights as standard fixtures. In 1920, electric lighting of signals was introduced between Dadar and Currey Road in Bombay.

1925–1951: Electrification and further expansion 

The first railway budget was presented in 1924. The Oudh and Rohilkhand Railway was merged with the East Indian Railway Company (EIR) in the same year. In 1930, the route of the Grand Trunk Express was changed to Delhi–Madras.

On 3 February 1925, India's first electric passenger train ran between Victoria Terminus (VT) and Kurla on 1500 V DC overhead traction with locomotives provided by the Cammell Laird and Waggonfabrik Uerdingen companies. Later that year the VT–Bandra section was electrified with an elevated platform at Sandhurst Road. Kurla–Kalyan and lines to Poona and Igatpuri were electrified in 1926 and the Bandra–Virar section was electrified by January 1928. On 1 June 1930, the Deccan Queen began running, hauled by a WCP-1 ( 20024, old No. EA/1 4006) with seven coaches, on the GIPR's electrified route from Bombay VT to Poona.

The Frontier Mail made its inaugural run between Bombay VT and Peshawar in 1928. In 1929, the Grand Trunk Express began running between Peshawar and Mangalore and the Punjab Limited Express began running between Bombay and Lahore. Technical advancements led to automatic colour-light signals become operational on GIPR's lines between Bombay VT and Byculla in 1928. This was extended to the Byculla–Kurla section in the following year.

1951–1983: Zonal re-organisation and further developments 

India's railways were re-organised into regional zones beginning in 1951 with the creation of the Southern Railway on 14 April and the Central Railway and Western Railways on 5 November. The post of Chief Commissioner of Railways was abolished and the Railway Board adopted the practice of making its senior-most member chairman. In the same year, the government of West Bengal entered into an agreement with Calcutta Tramways Co. to take over its administrative functions. On 14 April 1952, the Northern Railway, the Eastern Railway and the North-Eastern Railway were created. On 1 August 1955 the South-Eastern Railway was split from the Eastern Railway, and, the following year, divisional systems of administration were set up for the various regional zones. In 1958, the North-Eastern Railway split to form a new Northeast Frontier Railway.

In 1952, fans and lights were mandated for all compartments in passenger accommodation and sleeping accommodation was introduced in coaches. In 1956 the first fully air-conditioned train was introduced between Howrah and Delhi. In 1966 the first containerised freight services began, between Bombay and Ahmedabad.

In 1957 India Railways decided to adopt 25 kV AC electrification and chose the SNCF (French National Railway) as its technical consultant. The Main Line Electrification Project was established in the same year. Raj Kharswan–Dongoposi became the first section to be electrified with 25 kV AC traction, with the first train running on 11 August 1960. In 1966 electrification of several suburban tracks around Delhi, Madras and Calcutta was completed with the 25 kV AC system. In 1979 the Main Line Electrification Project was reconstituted into the Central Organisation for Railway Electrification (CORE).

1984–present: Rapid transit and later developments 

The Calcutta Metro became the first metro in the country with the 24 October 1984 line between Esplanade and Bhowanipore. In 1988 the first Shatabdi Express was introduced between New Delhi and Jhansi (later extended to Bhopal), and was the fastest train in India at the time. In 1993, air-conditioned third-tier coaches were introduced as well as a sleeper class separate from second class. In 1999, the South East Central Railway zone was established. On 6 July 2002, the East Coast, South Western, South East Central, North Central, and West Central zones were created.

India's first computerised ticketing and reservation was introduced in New Delhi in 1986. In 1990, the first self-printing ticket machine (SPTM) was introduced. In September 1996, the CONCERT computerised reservation system was fully deployed at New Delhi, Mumbai and Chennai. The project was completed nationwide on 18 April 1999. In 1998, coupon validating machines (CVMs) were introduced at Mumbai CST. Credit cards could be used to book tickets and reservations starting in 1999, and in February 2000, the Indian Railways launched its web site and began taking online train reservations and ticketing on 3 August 2002, which was extended to many cities in December. On 26 September 2013, the Tatkal system of ticketing extended to ordinary trains.

On 16 January 1995, the first regularly scheduled services using the 2 × 25 kV system of traction started on Bina–Katni. On 5 February 2012, Western Railway switched completely to 25 kV AC traction, ending its use of 1.5 kV DC traction. On 11 April 2016, Central Railway completed switching to 25 kV AC traction, ending the use of DC traction on the country's main-line rail network. Indian Railways announced on 31 March 2017 that the entire rail network would be electrified by 2022.

Historical railway length 
This table shows the length of the railway over time.

Route km : The distance between two points on the railway irrespective of the number of lines connecting them, whether single line or multiple line.
Running track km: The length of all running tracks excluding tracks in sidings, yards and crossings.
Total track km: The length of all running tracks and tracks including tracks in sidings, yards and crossings.

Rolling stock

Locomotives 

Locomotives in India largely consist of electric and diesel locomotives. The world's first compressed natural gas (CNG) locomotives are also used. Steam locomotives are used only in heritage trains.

In India, locomotives are classified according to their gauge, motive power, the work they are suited for and their power or model number. The class name, composed of four or five letters, encodes this information. The first letter denotes the track gauge; the second denotes their motive power, diesel or alternating current (electric); the third letter denotes the type of traffic for which they are suited (goods, passenger, multi or shunting). The fourth letter used to denote the chronological model number, but from 2002 it denotes the horsepower range for diesel locomotives. Electric locomotives are not covered by this scheme and not all diesels are covered; for these, the fourth letter denotes their chronological model number.

A locomotive may have a fifth letter in its class name which denotes a technical variant, subclass or subtype, indicating a variation in the basic model or series, possibly different motors or a different manufacturer. With the modern scheme for classifying diesel locomotives the fifth letter further refines the horsepower indication in  increments: 'A' for 100 hp, 'B' for 200 hp, 'C' for 300 hp, etc.

Under this scheme, a 'WDM-3A', for example, refers to a wide-gauge diesel multi-use 3100 hp locomotive, while a 'WDM-3D' would be a 3400 hp locomotive and 'WDM-3F' would be 3600 hp locomotive.

Diesel locomotives are fitted with auxiliary power units which save nearly 88% of fuel while idling.

Goods wagons 

A new wagon numbering system was adopted by Indian Railways in 2003. Wagons are allocated 11 digits, making identification easier and allowing for computerisation of a wagon's information. The first two digits indicate the type of wagon, the third and fourth digits indicate the owning railway, the fifth and sixth digits indicate the year of manufacture, the seventh through tenth digits indicate the Individual Wagon Number, and the last digit is a check digit.

IR's bulk requirement of wagons is met by wagon manufacturing units both in public and private sectors as well as other public sector units under the administrative control of Ministry of Railways.

Passenger coaches 

On long-distance routes and also on some shorter routes, IR uses two primary types of coach design types. ICF coach, in production from 1955 until January 2018, constitute the bulk of the current stock. These coaches, considered to have inadequate safety features, are slowly being phased out. , around 40,000 coaches are still in operation. These coaches are being replaced with LHB coach.

IR has introduced new electric multiple unit (EMU) train sets for long-distance routes. One such, Train-18 is under operation and another, Train-20 is expected to run from 2023. These train sets are expected to replace locomotive-hauled trains on long-distance routes.

On regional short-distance routes, IR runs Mainline electrical multiple unit (MEMU) or Diesel electrical multiple unit (DEMU) trains, depending on the traction available. These train sets are self-propelled with capability for faster acceleration or deceleration and are expected to reduce congestion on dense routes. Passenger locomotive-hauled trains, having frequent stops, are slowly being replaced with train sets across India.

On suburban commuter routes around large urban centers, IR runs trains with normal electric multiple unit (EMU) coaches. These are popularly called "local trains" or simply "locals".

EMUs are also used in metros. All train sets used in metros are air-conditioned. Kolkata trams almost always consist of a single motor coach. A new twin coach tram was introduced in Kolkata in 2019.

Manufacturing 

The Chittaranjan Locomotive Works in Chittaranjan and Banaras Locomotive Works in Varanasi make electric locomotives. The Integral Coach Factory in Perambur, Chennai, makes integral coaches. These have a monocoque construction, and the floor is an integral unit with the undercarriage. The Rail Coach Factory in Kapurthala also makes coaches. The Titagarh Wagons builds freight wagons. The Rail Wheel Factory at Yelahanka, Bangalore, and the Rail Wheel Plant, Bela, in Chhapra, Bihar, manufactures wheels and axles. Patiala Locomotive Works, Patiala upgrades the diesel locomotives. Some electric locomotives have been supplied by BHEL, Jhansi and Palakkad, and locomotive components are manufactured in several other plants around the country.

Network

Tracks 

The entire broad-gauge network is equipped with long-welded, high-tensile strength 52 kg/60 kg 90 UTS rails and pre-stressed concrete (PSC) sleepers with elastic fastenings.

 broad gauge is the gauge used by IR and spans almost the entire network, as of March 31, 2023. It is the broadest gauge in use across the world for regular passenger movement.

Urban rail transit systems in India mostly use standard gauge tracks. These systems are operated by metro/tram rail corporations which are independent of Indian Railways. Trams in Kolkata, the only remaining tram service in the country, uses standard gauge tracks. Line 1 of the Kolkata Metro and Delhi Metro use the same broad gauge tracks as main-line railways. All other metro linesconstructed, under construction and futureuse standard gauge tracks. Metro trains operate in Kolkata, Delhi, Bengaluru, Chennai, Mumbai, Hyderabad, Jaipur, Kochi, Nagpur, Ahmedabad and Lucknow. Gurgaon has a Metro system operated by a private organisation. Metro tracks are being constructed or planned in all million-plus cities in the country.

Electrification 

India uses 25 kV 50 Hz AC traction on all its electrified tracks.

Railway electrification in India began with the first electric train, between Chhatrapati Shivaji Terminus and Kurla on the Harbour Line, on 3 February 1925 on the Great Indian Peninsula Railway (GIPR) at 1500 V DC. Heavy gradients in the Western Ghats necessitated the introduction of electric traction on the GIPR to Igatpuri on the North East line and Pune on the South East line. On 5 January 1928, 1500 V DC traction was introduced on the suburban section of the Bombay, Baroda and Central India Railway between Colaba and Borivili, and between Madras Beach and Tambaram of the Madras and Southern Mahratta Railway on 11 May 1931, to meet growing traffic needs. The 3000 V DC electrification of the Howrah-Burdwan section of the Eastern Railway was completed in 1958. The first 3000 V DC EMU service began on the Howrah-Sheoraphuli section on 14 December 1957.

Research and trials in Europe, particularly on French Railways (SNCF), indicated that 25 kV AC was an economical electrification system. Indian Railways decided in 1957 to adopt 25 kV AC as its standard, with SNCF their consultant in the early stages. The first 25 kV AC section was Raj Kharswan–Dongoaposi on the South Eastern Railway in 1960. The first 25 kV AC EMUs, for Kolkata suburban service, began service in September 1962. For continuity, the Howrah–Burdwan section of the Eastern Railway and the Madras Beach–Tambaram section of the Southern Railway were converted to 25 kV AC by 1968. Because of limitations in the DC traction system, a decision was made to convert the electric traction system of the Mumbai suburban rail network of WR and CR from 1.5kV DC to 25 kV AC in 1996–97. The conversion from DC to AC traction was completed in 2012 by the Western Railway, and in 2016 by the Central Railway. Since then, the entire electrified mainline rail network in India uses 25 kV AC, and DC traction is used only for metros and trams.

Indian Railways announced on 31 March 2017 that the country's entire rail network would be electrified by 2022. These savings will allow the government channel funds to invest in the modernisation of the railway infrastructure. Close to 30 billion units of electricity will be required for railway electrification on an annual basis by 2022, which will lead to opportunities for IPPs of conventional power.

All metro routes, as well as the Kolkata tram, are electrified with DC traction. Many metro routes employ the third rail method for electric traction.

Signaling and telecommunication 

IR uses a range of signalling technologies and methods to manage its train operations based on traffic density and safety requirements.

Remaining routes are based on absolute block signalling with trains manually controlled by signalmen from the signal boxes typically located at stations. Few low density routes still use manual block signalling methods with communication on track clearance based on physical exchange of tokens. In a few sections, intermediate block signalling is provided to further enhance line capacity with minimal investment. , 602 block sections have intermediate block signals on IR.

IR primarily uses coloured signal lights, which replaced semaphores and disc-based signalling (dependent on position or colour). IR uses two-aspect, three-aspect and four (or multiple) aspect colour signalling across its network.

Signals at most stations are interlocked using panel interlocking, route-relay interlocking or electronic interlocking methods, which eliminate human error. IR uses track circuiting, and block proving axle counters for train detection. , 5,886 stations across IR have interlocked stations and multi-aspect signalling. Around 99% of key routes (A, B, C and D) have track circuitry or block proving axle counters for automated train detection. IR has about 59,105 route kilometers of optical fiber cable network across India, that is used for train control, voice and data communication. Around  of the route is covered by GSM-R based Mobile Train Radio Communication.

Currently IR uses Centralised Traffic Control (CTC) on the busy Ghaziabad – Kanpur route and real-time train monitoring systems on Mumbai and Kolkata suburban routes.

International connections

Rail links between India and neighbouring countries are not well developed.

Bangladesh 

Bangladesh is connected by the biweekly Maitree Express, which runs from Kolkata railway station to Dhaka Cantonment, the Bandhan Express, which began running commercial trips between Kolkata railway station and Khulna railway station and Mitali Express connecting New Jalpaiguri railway station with Dhaka Cantonment railway station which started commercial services from 1 June 2022.

Indian and Bangladeshi governments planned to start work by January 2015 on a new rail link to ease surface transport. India will build a  railway linking Tripura's capital Agartala with Bangladesh's southeastern city of Akhaura, an important railway junction connected to Chittagong port, resource-rich Sylhet and Dhaka. An agreement to implement the railway project was signed between India's former Prime Minister Manmohan Singh and Bangladeshi Prime Minister Sheikh Hasina during her visit to India in January 2010. The total cost of the proposed project is estimated at 252 crore (2.5 billion). The Indian Railway Construction Company (IRCON) would lay the new railway tracks on both sides of the border. Of the  rail line,  of tracks fall in Indian territory.

Bhutan 

An  railway link with Bhutan is being constructed from Hasimara in West Bengal to Toribari in Bhutan.

Myanmar 

No rail link exists with Myanmar but a railway line is to be built from Jiribam (in Manipur) to Tamu through Imphal and Moreh. The construction of this missing link, as per the feasibility study conducted by the Ministry of External Affairs through RITES Ltd, is estimated to cost .

Nepal 

Two rail links to Nepal exist: A passenger service between Jainagar and Janakpur which is run and operated by Nepal Railways and freight services between Raxaul and Birganj.

Pakistan 

Two trains were operated to Pakistan: the Samjhauta Express between Delhi and Lahore, and the Thar Express between Jodhpur and Karachi. Since 2019, both services have been shut down.

Services

Passenger service

Station categories 
From December 2017, stations are categorised into the Non-Suburban Group NSG1 to NSG6, the Suburban Group SG1 to SG3, and the Halt Group HG1 to HG3 based on the earnings, passenger footfall and strategic importance.

Before December 2017, stations were classified into A1, A, B, C, D, E and F categories, based only on the passenger earnings from the sales of platform tickets, thus limiting the ability of IR to better focus its investments in passenger amenities.

Travel classes 

IR has several classes of travelwith or without air conditioning; a train may include just one or several of these. Slow passenger trains have only unreserved seating class whereas Rajdhani, Duronto, Shatabdi, Garib Rath and Yuva trains only have air-conditioned classes. The fares are different for each class, with unreserved seating class being the cheapest. The fare of Rajdhani, Duronto and Shatabdi trains includes food served in the train, but for other trains food has to be bought separately. In September 2016, the IR introduced dynamic fares for all accommodation classes for Rajdhani, Duronto and Shatabdi trains (except 1AC and EC classes) to shore up revenue. In long-distance trains a pantry car is usually included and the food is served at the berth or seat itself. Luxury trains such as Palace on Wheels have separate dining cars but fares are comparable to a five-star hotel.

A standard passenger train has four unreserved (also called "general") coaches, two at the front and two at the end, of which one may be exclusively for women. The number of other coaches varies according to the demand and route. A luggage coach may be included at the front or end. In some mail trains, a separate mail coach is attached. Lavatories are communal and feature both the Indian style as well as the Western style.

The following table lists the classes in operation. A train may not include all of these classes.

At the rear of the train is a special compartment known as the guard's cabin. It is fitted with a transceiver and is where the guard usually gives the all-clear signal before the train departs.

Train types 

Trains are sorted into categories which dictate the number of stops on a route, their priority on the network and their fare structure. Each express train is identified by a five-digit number. If the first digit is one or two, they are long-distance express trains. If the first digit is zero, the train is a special train which will operate for a limited period of time with a different fare structure. A first digit of five denotes a passenger train.

The second digit indicates the zone operating the train. However, for high-speed trains, the second digit is either zero or two (the first remains one or two). The third digit denotes the division within the zone which is responsible for maintenance and cleanliness, and the last two digits are the train's serial number. The train numbering system was changed from four digits from December 2010, to accommodate an increasing number of trains.

Trains traveling in opposite directions along the same route are usually labelled with consecutive numbers. However, there is considerable variation in train numbers; some zones, such as the Central Railway, have a less-systematic method of numbering trains.

Trains are classified by average speed. A faster train has fewer stops (halts) than a slower one, and is usually used for long-distance travel. Most express trains have special names to identify them easily. The names of the trains usually denote the regions they connect; the routes they traverse; a famous person; or a tourist spot connected with the train.

Tourism 
There are several train services which run for tourists:

 The Palace on Wheels is a luxury-train service, frequently hauled by a steam locomotive, to promote tourism in Rajasthan. The train has a seven-night, eight-day itinerary on a round trip from New Delhi via Jaipur, Sawai Madhopur and Chittaurgarh, Udaipur, Jaisalmer, Jodhpur, Bharatpur and Agra.
 The Royal Rajasthan on Wheels covers a number of tourist destinations in Rajasthan. The seven-day, eight-night tour is a round trip from New Delhi's Safdarjung station via Jodhpur, Udaipur and Chittaurgarh, Ranthambore National Park and Jaipur, Khajuraho, Varanasi and Sarnath, and Agra.
 The Maharajas' Express, a luxury train operated by the Indian Railway Catering and Tourism Corporation (IRCTC), runs on five routes to about 12 destinations across north-West and central India (centered around Rajasthan) from October to April.
 The Deccan Odyssey covers tourist destinations in Maharashtra and Goa. Its seven-night, eight-day tour begins in Mumbai and stops at Jaigad Fort, Ganapatipule and Ratnagiri, Sindhudurg, Tarkarli and Sawantwadi, Goa, Kolhapur and Pune (Day 5), Aurangabad and Ellora Caves, and Ajanta Caves and Nashik. The Golden Chariot runs on two tours: Pride of the South and Splendor of the South.
 The Golden Chariot is a luxury train service which connects tourist destinations in Karnataka, Goa, Kerala & Tamil Nadu.
 The Mahaparinirvan Express, an air-conditioned service also known as the Buddhist Circuit Train, is run by the IRCTC for Buddhist pilgrims. Its seven-night, eight-day tour begins in New Delhi and visits Bodh Gaya, Rajgir and Nalanda, Varanasi and Sarnath, Kushinagar and Lumbini, Sravasti and the Taj Mahal.
 The Fairy Queen, a tourist attraction as the world's oldest operating steam engine, hauls a luxury train from Delhi to Alwar.

Ticketing 

India has some of the lowest train fares in the world. Basic passenger traffic is heavily subsidised by more-expensive higher-class fares. Until the late 1980s, Indian Railways ticket reservations were done manually. In 1987 the Railways started using a computerised ticketing system. The entire ticketing system went online in 1995 to provide up-to-date information on status and availability. The ticketing network is computerised to a large extent, with the exception of some remote places. Computerised tickets can be booked for any two points in the country, through the Internet and via mobile phones, though this method carries an additional surcharge.

Discounted tickets are available for senior citizens (above 60 years) and some other categories of passengers including the disabled, students, athletes, persons affected by serious diseases, or persons appearing for competitive examinations. One compartment of the lowest class of accommodation is reserved for women in every passenger-carrying train. Some berths or seats in sleeper class and second class are also reserved for women. Season tickets permitting unlimited travel on specific sections or specific trains for a specific time period may also be available. Foreign tourists can buy an Indrail Pass, which is modelled on the Eurail Pass, permitting unlimited travel in India for a specific time period.

For long-distance travel, reservation of a berth can be made up to 120 days before departure. Details such as name, age and concession (if eligible) are required and are recorded on the ticket. The ticket price usually includes the base fare, which depends on the classification of the train (example: super-fast surcharge if the train is classified as super-fast), the class in which one wishes to travel and the reservation charge for overnight journeys.

If a seat is not available then the ticket is given a waitlist number; otherwise the ticket is confirmed and a berth number is printed on the ticket. A person receiving a wait-listed ticket may be able to obtain a confirmed ticket if there are sufficient cancellations. Some of the tickets are assigned to the Reservation against Cancellation (RAC), which is between the waiting list and the confirmed list. These allow the ticket holder to board the train and obtain an allotted seat decided by a ticket collector, after the ticket collector has ascertained that a seat is vacant.

Reserved railway tickets can be booked through the website of Indian Railway Catering and Tourism Corporation (IRCTC) and also through mobile phones via SMS. Tickets booked through this site are categorised into iTickets and eTickets. iTickets are booked by a passenger and then printed and delivered to the passenger. eTickets are printed by the passenger and carried while travelling. While travelling on an eTicket, one must carry an authorised valid photo identity card. Cancellation of eTickets is done online, without the requirement for the passenger to go to any counter. Unreserved tickets are available for purchase on the platform at any time before departure. An unreserved-ticket holder may only board the general-compartment class. All suburban networks issue unreserved tickets valid for a limited time. For frequent commuters, a season pass (monthly or quarterly) guarantees unlimited travel between two stops.

Freight service 

In the freight segment, IR ferries various commodities and fuels in industrial, consumer, and agricultural segments across India. IR has historically subsidised the passenger segment with income from the freight business. As a result, freight services are unable to compete with other modes of transport on both cost and speed of delivery, leading to continuous erosion of market share. To counter this downward trend, IR has started new initiatives in freight segments including the upgrade of existing goods sheds, attracting private capital to build multi-commodity multi-modal logistics terminals, changing container sizes, operating time-tabled freight trains, and tweaking with the freight pricing/product mix. Also, end-to-end integrated transport solutions such as roll-on, roll-off (RORO) service, a road-rail system pioneered by Konkan Railway Corporation in 1999 to carry trucks on flatbed trailers, is now being extended to other routes across India.

A potential game-changer for IR in the freight segment are the new dedicated freight corridors that are expected to be completed by 2020. They will also free-up capacity on dense passenger routes and allow IR to run more trains at higher speeds. Additional corridors are being planned to augment the freight infrastructure in the country.

Urban rail

The urban rail transit in India consists of systems such as Rapid transit (Metro), Suburban rail (operated by Indian railways), Light rail (Metrolite), Tram, Regional rail and Monorail. India has one of the largest and busiest urban transit systems in the world.

Administration
The administration of Urban rail in India falls under Ministry of Urban Development's Urban Transport wing which is the nodal division for coordination, appraisal and approval of Urban Transport matters including urban rail Projects at the central level since the National Urban Transport Policy in 2006.

Private railways
Though state-owned companies like Indian Railways and the various metro companies enjoy a near monopoly in India, a few private railways do exist. These private railway lines are used exclusively for freight.

There are railway lines owned and operated by companies including plantations, sugar mills, collieries and other mines, dams, harbours and ports. Private railways are operated by the Mumbai Port Trust, the Chennai Port Trust, the Kolkata Port Trust, the Visakhapatnam Port Trust and the Bhilai Steel Plant. The Tata Group operate funicular railways at Bhira and at Bhivpuri Road (as well as the Kamshet–Shirawta Dam railway line). The Pipavav Rail Corporation holds a 33-year concession for building and operating a railway line from Pipavav to Surendranagar. The Kutch Railway Company, a joint venture of the Gujarat state government and private parties, is involved (alongside the Kandla Port Trust and the Gujarat Adani Port) to build the Gandhidham–Palanpur line.

UNESCO World Heritage Sites 

There are two UNESCO World Heritage Sites on Indian Railways, the Chhatrapati Shivaji Maharaj Terminus and the Mountain Railways of India. The latter consists of three separate railway lines located in different parts of India: the Darjeeling Himalayan Railway, a  narrow gauge railway in Lesser Himalayas in the state of West Bengal, the Nilgiri Mountain Railway, a  rack railway in the Nilgiri Hills in the state of Tamil Nadu and the Kalka–Shimla Railway, a  narrow gauge railway in the Siwalik Hills in the state of Himachal Pradesh.

Future 

IR's Research Design and Standards Organisation (RDSO) undertakes research, design and standardisation. The railway has undertaken several initiatives to upgrade its ageing infrastructure and improve its quality of service. The Indian government plans to invest  to upgrade IR by 2020.

Infrastructure modernisation projects include high-speed rail, with the first Ahmedabad-Mumbai train in operation for 2022; the redevelopment of 400 stations by monetizing  of spare railway land under a  plan; doubling tracks to reduce congestion and delays while improving safety; the refurbishing of 12- to 15-year-old coaches at the Carriage Rehabilitation Workshop in Bhopal to enhance passenger amenities and fire safety; use of Global Positioning System (GPS)-enabled tracking of trains to improve safety and service; Digital India-driven  digitalisation of the railway to improve efficiency and reduce cost; rainwater harvesting, with 1885 systems installed by December 2016; and reforestation of railway land and along the tracks.

All routes will be electrified to save on imported-fuel costs. Off-the-grid solar-powered trains are planned with the installation of one gigawatt of solar and 130 megawatts of wind power between 2017 and 2022; India introduced the world's first solar-powered train and 50 coaches with rooftop solar farms in June 2017. Initial assessments of this experiment have been positive. Rooftop solar electricity is planned at stations to reduce long-term fuel costs and protect the environment. and Sustainable LED lighting at all the stations was completed by March 2018 which saves Rs 500 million per annum in electricity bills. Locomotive factories have been modernised, including two new factories in Bihar: an electric locomotive factory in Madhepura and a diesel locomotive factory in Marhaura, and 2,285 bio-toilets were introduced from April to July 2014. A  partnership with Alstom to supply 800 electric locomotives from 2018 to 2028 was announced.

All the unstaffed level crossings were eliminated by January 2019, and staffed level crossings are being progressively replaced by overbridges and underbridges. Other safety projects include the extension of an automated fire alarm system, first introduced on Rajdhani Express trains in 2013, to all air-conditioned coaches; and 6,095 GPS-enabled Fog Pilot Assistance System railway signalling devices (replacing the practice of placing firecrackers on tracks to alert train drivers) installed in 2017 in four zones: Northern, North Central, North Eastern and North Western; and replacing ICF coach with LHB coach.

See also

 Rail transport
 List of railway stations in India
 List of high-speed railway lines in India
 Dedicated freight corridors in India
 List of countries by rail transport network size
 Urban rail transit in India
 High-speed rail in India

 Other
 Air transport in India
 Aerial lift in India
 Bharatmala
 Expressways of India
 Indian Human Spaceflight Programme
 Transport in India
 UDAN, national airport transport connectivity scheme
 Water transport in India

Notes

References

Further reading 

 Aguiar, Marian. Tracking Modernity: India's Railway and the Culture of Mobility  (University of Minnesota Press; 2011) 226 pages; draws on literature, film, and other realms to explore the role of the railway in the Indian imagination. excerpt and text search
 Bear, Linda. Lines of the Nation: Indian Railway Workers, Bureaucracy, and the Intimate Historical Self (2007)   excerpt and text search
 Donaldson, Dave. "Railroads of the Raj: Estimating the impact of transportation infrastructure." American Economic Review 108.4–5 (2018): 899–934. online, econometric study
 Kerr, Ian J. Railways in Modern India (2001) excerpt and text search
 Kerr, Ian J. Engines of Change: The Railroads That Made India (2006)
 Kerr, Ian J. Building the Railways of the Raj, 1850–1900. (New Delhi: Oxford University Press, 1995).
 Kumar, Sudhir, and Shagun Mehrotra. Bankruptcy to Billions: How the Indian Railways Transformed Itself (2009)
 
 
 
 Pradhan, Rudra P., and Tapan P. Bagchi. "Effect of transportation infrastructure on economic growth in India: The VECM approach." Research in Transportation economics 38.1 (2013): 139–148.
 Singh, Sanjay K. "Review of urban transportation in India." Journal of public transportation 8.1 (2005): 5+. online

External links

 Indian Railways – official website
 Glossary